Sir John Turner, 3rd Baronet  (1712–1780), of Warham, Norfolk, was a British lawyer and politician who sat in the House of Commons from 1739 to 1774.

Turner was baptized on 19 June 1712, the only son of Sir John Turner, 2nd Baronet, of Warham and his wife Anne Allen, daughter of Thomas Allen, London merchant.  He was educated at. Greenwich school and was admitted at Middle Temple  on 20 February 1729 and Christ's College, Cambridge on 9 January 1730. In 1736 he was called to the bar. He succeeded his father to the baronetcy on 6 January 1739.

Turner was returned as Member of Parliament for King's Lynn at a by-election on 9 February 1739 in succession to his uncle, Sir Charles Turner, 1st Baronet.  He voted with the Government in every recorded division. He was returned unopposed at the 1741 British general election, and won in a contest at the 1747 British general election.

Turner married Miss Stonehouse on 20 October 1746. She died in 1749 and he married again to Frances Neale, daughter of John Neale of Allesley, Warwickshire.

Turner was returned unopposed for King's Lynn again at the 1754 British general election, On 3 May 1757 he voted for Townshend's motion on the Minorca inquiry in opposition to Newcastle and Fox. At the 1761 British general election, he was again returned unopposed. He made his first recorded speech, on 14 December1761,  to second Lord Strange's bill to make the militia permanent.  He followed Bute, and in May 1762 was appointed Lord of Treasury when Bute became its first lord. He remained in office under Grenville, and supported the Administration over Wilkes and general warrants, but apparently took no part in the debates. When the Rockingham Administration took over, Turner lost his place in July 1765 and for a while continued to adhere to Grenville. He voted against the repeal of the Stamp Act. He became a bencher on his Inn in 1766. At the 1768 British general election there was a contest at King's Lynn, and Turner narrowly escaped defeat. He had become unpopular both on personal grounds and because of his attitude on general warrants. He seems to have lost interest in politics, and his only known vote in that Parliament was with Administration over the Middlesex election on 8 May 1769. His interest at King's Lynn had been seriously weakened, and he decided not to contest the borough at the 1774 British general election

Turner died 25 June 1780, leaving two daughters,  and was buried at Warham.  On his death the baronetcy became extinct.

References

1712 births
1780 deaths
British MPs 1734–1741
British MPs 1741–1747
British MPs 1747–1754
British MPs 1754–1761
British MPs 1761–1768
British MPs 1768–1774
Members of the Parliament of Great Britain for English constituencies
Turner baronets
People from Warham, Norfolk